AK Press is a worker-managed, independent publisher, and book distributor that specialises in radical left and anarchist literature. Operated out of Chico, California, the company is collectively owned.

History
AK was founded in Stirling, Scotland by Ramsey Kanaan in 1987 as a small mail order outlet, and named for his mother, Ann Kanaan. The project soon expanded, venturing into independent book publishing. 

Kanaan and several other members of AK Press left in 2007 to form the publishing company PM Press. 

In March 2015, a deadly fire at AK Press' warehouse in West Oakland, California, prompted the press to relocate to Chico.

In 2020, AK Press joined as a founding member of the Radical Publishers' Alliance.

Operations 
AK Press is organised as a workers' co-operative; the press is owned by all members of the collective and works without bosses, with every member partaking in each function of the organisation. It operates online through akpress.org in the United States, and through akuk.com in Europe. In the US, it manages a "Bookmobile" (which is not a physical automobile, but "an announcement, an opportunity") that sells books at various gatherings around the country (including protests, academic and activist conferences, anarchist book fairs, etc.). In the United Kingdom, AK Press manages stalls at similar events. 

Works published by AK Press include reprints of radical classics as well as original works; its book topics include anarchism, globalisation, and animal rights.

Historically, in addition to books, AK Press has released spoken word albums by figures such as Noam Chomsky, Howard Zinn, Jello Biafra, Arundhati Roy and Mumia Abu-Jamal and music by artists including David Rovics and Utah Phillips.

The business also sells clothing, buttons, stickers, and various other related items like an upside down map of the world and the red and black flag of anarcho-communism.

See also
 List of books about anarchism
 Anarchist bookfairs
 List of book distributors

References

Further reading 

 
 
 
 Shaw, Megan. Interview with Craig Gilmore, Ramsey Kanaan, and Craig O'Hara of AK Press. Punk Planet March/April 2000, 59.

External links
 AK Press
 Revolution by the Book, AK Press blog
 AK Press UK
 Author Ward Churchill
 "Anarchy Reigns at AK Press", Publishers Weekly

Anarchist publishing companies
Political book publishing companies
Publishing collectives
Book publishing companies of Scotland
Book publishing companies based in California
Worker cooperatives of the United States
Publishing companies established in 1987
1987 establishments in Scotland
Stirling (council area)
Companies based in Chico, California
Book publishing companies based in the San Francisco Bay Area
Far-left politics in Scotland
Anarchism in Scotland
Anarchism in the United States
Anarchist organizations in the United States